Bangladesh first conceived building a nuclear power plant in 1961. The Bangladesh Atomic Energy Commission was established in 1973. The country currently operates a TRIGA research reactor at the Atomic Energy Research Establishment in Savar.

More recently, in 2001 Bangladesh adopted a national Nuclear Power Action Plan. On 24 June 2007, Bangladesh's government announced plans to build a nuclear power plant to meet electricity shortages. In May 2010, Bangladesh entered into a civilian nuclear agreement with the Russian Federation. It also has framework agreements for peaceful nuclear energy applications with the US, France and China.

In February 2011, Bangladesh reached an agreement with Russia to build the 2,000 megawatt (MW) Ruppur Nuclear Power Plant with two reactors, each of which will generate 1,200 MW of power. The nuclear power plant will be built at Ruppur, on the banks of the Padma River, in the Ishwardi subdistrict of Pabna, in the northwest of the country. The RNPP is estimated to cost up to US$2 billion, and start operating by 2023.
The inter-governmental agreement (IGA) was officially signed on 2 November 2011.
Adjusted cost for construction and commissioning of the Ruppur plant is $12.65 billion.

On 29 May 2013 Bangladesh's Prime Minister declared that a second 2 GW nuclear power plant will be constructed in the southern region of the country. In 2019, site selection was still in progress, with a focus on the coastal region at the Bay of Bengal.

Background 
For Bangladesh, which is a historically agrarian country, the agricultural sector has shrunk from over 30% in the 1980s to under 20% a decade into the millennium. On the other hand, industry is growing from under 20% in the 1980s to over 30% currently. With highly industry national economy, the generation of electricity will be linearly related to the national GDP. With lesser agriculture and more industry, not only more emissions will be given off to the atmosphere but lack of trees and plants will hinder any chance of carbon sequestration.

The underdeveloped and mismanaged energy infrastructure of Bangladesh has inhibited economic growth (See: Electricity sector in Bangladesh). With a derated capacity of around 5500 Megawatt (MW) on an installed rating of over 6000 MW, only around 4000 is actually available. With a maximum generation of 4500 MW in mid-2010 to 4700 MW in late 2010, the peak is anywhere from 5700 MW to 6000 MW and only about 40% to 48% of the total population have access to electricity. The per capita consumption of 218-230 kWh and the availability is the lower among any developing country in the world.

Current energy sources 
The main source of national energy is in its natural gas reserves 55% of it goes to the power generation sector while 27% goes to factories and industry, 10% to household purposes and 5% in the automotive sector. Furthermore, the government has a targeted six, 5-year plans from 2010 to 2021 where it would try to produce 8,500 MW in 2013, 11,500 MW in 2015 and 20,000 MW by 2021. It is a part of the ‘Digital Bangladesh’ scheme's Vision 21 where the government would seek universal electrification around the nation. The plan also targets an increase in domestic and important coal based power plants, and more on-shore or off-shore gas exploration. Ruppur Nuclear Power Plant Implementation Project (RNNP) is also one such scheme to reach an addition capacity of 9000 MW.

Currently, around 88% of energy used for power generation is from natural gas sources and 4% from coal, 6% from oil and just 2% from Hydro-based power plants in Chittagong. Renewable Energy sources are totally excluded from any contributions. By 2021, the target plans to reduce gas imports to 30%, while raising coal contributions to 53%. This will have disastrous effects. Finally by 2030, renewable energy contributions would by increased to a mere 6%, while nuclear power was increased to around 30%.

Waste disposal

There are arguments in favour of nuclear energy when compared to the use of coal. For example, a single 1000 MW coal-fired plant produces over 300,000 tonnes of ash, 44,000 tons of sulphur dioxide, 22,000 tonnes of Nitrous Oxide and 6 million tonnes of carbon. In contrast, a 1000 MW of nuclear power plant produces 3 cubic metres of waste after reprocessing the spent fuel, 300 tons of radioactive waste and 0.20 tonnes of plutonium. However, a unit tonne of nuclear waste is far more dangerous than the same amount of coal-fired plant waste, if not managed properly. At the same time, dealing with nuclear wastes is more expensive.

Nuclear waste disposal will be managed by Radioactive Waste Management Company, to be formed according to Bangladesh government's National Policy on Radioactive Waste and Spent Nuclear Fuel Management-2019. Bangladesh plans to store nuclear waste for a given period, after which the waste will be sent to Russia. Spent fuel may be reprocessed in Russia for fast breeder reactors.

Costs 
There are also different transport requirements for both nuclear fuel and fossil fuels in the context of Bangladesh. Transportation costs are higher for coal and oil systems at 20,000 train cars or 10 supertankers, in relation to a nuclear plant at just 3–4 trucks. Around the world, there is projected to be around 860 nuclear power plants generating over 800,000 MW.

As of 2018, the estimated cost for waste management, disposal, and decommissioning has not been released.

Disaster management 
According to the 4th IPCC, climate change in the region of the project area could cause exacerbate significant river erosion, deposition and flooding which would be of concern. River erosion is a significant hazard along all of Bangladesh's rivers which destroys land and critical infrastructure continually, rendering thousands homeless and displaced every year.  The site area immediately downstream from the Indian border is in addition vulnerable to unilateral bank protection construction.

See also

 Bangladesh Atomic Energy Commission

References

External links
 Bangladesh Atomic Energy Commission – Official Website